Edin Višća (born 17 February 1990) is a Bosnian professional footballer who plays as a winger for Süper Lig club Trabzonspor.

Višća started his professional career at Budućnost Banovići, before joining Željezničar in 2009. Two years later, he moved to İstanbul Başakşehir. In 2022, he signed with Trabzonspor.

A former youth international for Bosnia and Herzegovina, Višća made his senior international debut in 2010, earning over 50 caps and scoring 10 goals until 2020. He represented the nation at their first major championship, the 2014 FIFA World Cup.

Club career

Early career
Višća came through Budućnost Banovići's youth setup, which he joined in 2005. He made his professional debut against Ozren Semizovac on 10 September 2007 at the age of 17.

Željezničar
In September 2009, Višća signed a three-year deal with Željezničar. He made his official debut for the team against Čelik Zenica on 27 February 2010. On 3 April, he scored his first goal for Željezničar in a triumph over Travnik. He won his first trophy with the club on 23 May, when they were crowned league champions.

İstanbul Başakşehir
In August 2011, Višća was transferred to Turkish outfit İstanbul Başakşehir for an undisclosed fee. He made his competitive debut for the side on 11 September against Galatasaray. On 3 January 2012, he scored his first goal for the team against the same opponent.

He made his 100th appearance for the side against Gaziantep on 20 April 2014.

Višća was an important piece in İstanbul Başakşehir's capture of 1. Lig title, his first trophy with the club, which was secured on 23 April and earned them promotion to Süper Lig just one season after being relegated. He had an impact of 10 goals and 10 assists.

In August 2016, he extended his contract until June 2020.

He scored his 51st goal for the team in a defeat of Kayserispor on 14 January 2017, becoming their top all-time goalscorer.

Višća played his 200th game for the club on 18 February against Gaziantepspor.

On 2 May 2019, he was named Süper Lig's player of the season, which made him first Bosnian player ever to win that award.

He appeared in his 300th game for the side on 24 May against Alanyaspor and managed to score a goal.

Višća was instrumental in İstanbul Başakşehir's conquest of Süper Lig title, first in their history, which was sealed on 19 July 2020. He scored 13 goals and added 13 assists.

His 100th goal for the club came in a loss to Kasımpaşa on 26 July.

In October, he signed a new five-year deal with İstanbul Başakşehir.

On 20 October, Višća debuted in UEFA Champions League away at RB Leipzig. Two weeks later, he scored his first goal in the competition against Manchester United.

Trabzonspor
In January 2022, Višća moved to Trabzonspor on a contract until June 2025. He debuted officially for the side against Sivasspor on 15 January. On 23 January, he scored his first goal for Trabzonspor against Galatasaray, which secured the victory for his team. He won his first trophy with the club on 30 April, when they were proclaimed league champions.

International career
Višća represented Bosnia and Herzegovina at various youth levels.

In November 2010, he received his first senior call-up, for a friendly game against Poland, and debuted in that game on 10 December.

In June 2014, Višća was named in Bosnia and Herzegovina's squad for 2014 FIFA World Cup, country's first major competition. He made his tournament debut in the opening group match against Argentina on 15 June.

On 12 June 2015, in a UEFA Euro 2016 qualifier against Israel, Višća scored a brace, his first senior international goals.

He scored his first career hat-trick against South Korea on 1 June 2018.

Višća retired from international football on 21 May 2021.

Personal life
Višća is a practising Muslim; along with international teammates Ibrahim Šehić, Muhamed Bešić, Armin Hodžić, Izet Hajrović, Sead Kolašinac and Ervin Zukanović he visited a mosque in Zenica during national team concentration.

Career statistics

Club

International

Scores and results list Bosnia and Herzegovina's goal tally first, score column indicates score after each Višća goal.

Honours
Željezničar
Bosnian Premier League: 2009–10
Bosnian Cup: 2010–11

İstanbul Başakşehir
Süper Lig: 2019–20
1. Lig: 2013–14

Trabzonspor
Süper Lig: 2021–22
Turkish Super Cup: 2022

Individual
Süper Lig Player of the Season: 2018–19
Süper Lig Top Assist Provider: 2017–18, 2018–19, 2019–20

References

External links

1990 births
Living people
People from Olovo
Bosniaks of Bosnia and Herzegovina
Bosnia and Herzegovina Muslims
Bosnia and Herzegovina footballers
Bosnia and Herzegovina youth international footballers
Bosnia and Herzegovina under-21 international footballers
Bosnia and Herzegovina international footballers
Bosnia and Herzegovina expatriate footballers
Association football wingers
FK Budućnost Banovići players
FK Željezničar Sarajevo players
İstanbul Başakşehir F.K. players
Trabzonspor footballers
First League of the Federation of Bosnia and Herzegovina players
Premier League of Bosnia and Herzegovina players
Süper Lig players
TFF First League players
Expatriate footballers in Turkey
Bosnia and Herzegovina expatriate sportspeople in Turkey
2014 FIFA World Cup players